Sentinel Initiative is a set of efforts by U.S. Food and Drug Administration (FDA) that tries to improve the ability to identify and evaluate safety of medicinal products.

It has several parts: Sentinel System, Postmarket Rapid Immunization Safety Monitoring (PRISM) system, and Blood Safety Continuous Active Surveillance Network (BloodSCAN). Part of Sentinel Initiative is a surveillance program for biologics. It is called Biologics Effectiveness and Safety (BEST) Initiative.

Sentinel System
The Sentinel System uses pre-existing electronic healthcare data (including billing data). Part of the Sentinel System is a tool called Active Postmarket Risk Identification and Analysis (ARIA) system that was mandated in the U.S. Food and Drug Administration (FDA) Amendments Act (FDAAA) of 2007.

See also 
 Health informatics
 Real world data
 Real world evidence

References 

Food and Drug Administration